The 1991 Virginia Slims of Los Angeles was a women's tennis tournament played on outdoor hard courts at the Manhattan Country Club in Manhattan Beach, California in the United States that was part of the Tier II category of the 1991 WTA Tour. It was the 18th edition of the tournament and was held from August 12 through August 18, 1991. First-seeded Monica Seles won her second consecutive singles title at the event and earned $70,000 first-prize money.

Finals

Singles

 Monica Seles defeated  Kimiko Date 6–3, 6–1
 It was Seles' 5th singles title of the year and the 15th of her career.

Doubles

 Larisa Neiland /  Natasha Zvereva defeated  Gretchen Magers /  Robin White 6–1, 2–6, 6–2

References

External links
 ITF tournament edition details
 Tournament draws

Virginia Slims of Los Angeles
LA Women's Tennis Championships
Sports competitions in Manhattan Beach, California
Virginia Slims of Los Angeles
Virginia Slims of Los Angeles
Virginia Slims of Los Angeles